Cerion  may refer to:
 Cerion (gastropod), a genus of small to medium-sized tropical air-breathing land snails in the family Cerionidae
 Cerion (fungus), a genus of fungi in the family Rhytismataceae